Visitation is a c.1524-1528 oil on canvas painting of the Visitation by Giovanni Cariani. It is unrecorded before its appearance in the 1929 catalogue of the Kunsthistorisches Museum in Vienna, where it still hangs. No commissioner or precise date can be ascribed to it.

References

1520s paintings
Paintings in the collection of the Kunsthistorisches Museum